C.D. Sayaxché is a Guatemalan football club based in Sayaxché, Petén Department.

Founded in 2003 the team plays their home games in the Estadio Municipal La Pasión.

The team's colours are green, red and white.

Squad 2013
Carlos Díaz
Moisés Carménate
Jimmy Flores
Milton López
Daniel Zegarra
Enrique Flores
Edwin Garrido
Robin García
Nathan García
Ludwin Villeda
Darin Medrano
Yony Valenzuela
Gerson Castellanos
Jardy López
Gilberth Artavia
Cándido Ondo
Christian Flores

References

External links
Soccerway

Football clubs in Guatemala
Association football clubs established in 2003
2003 establishments in Guatemala